Louis-Pierre Gravel was a French Canadian missionary and colonizer who founded the town of Gravelbourg in Saskatchewan, Canada. He was born in Stanfold (now called Princeville), Quebec on August 8, 1868, and was ordained as priest on August 28, 1892, after finishing his studies at seminaries in Trois-Rivières, Nicolet and Montreal, Quebec. After serving in parishes in New York City from 1892 to 1906, he was asked to found a French Canadian parish in the south-west of Saskatchewan. In 1906, he founded the town of Gravelbourg. Aiding him in his endeavors were five of his brothers, which included Henri and Maurice, both doctors; Alphonse and Emile, both lawyer; Guy, a pharmacist; plus a sister, Laurianne, the wife of Georges Hébert, also a lawyer. He persuaded many French Canadian Catholics to settle in the Gravelbourg, Lafleche, Mazenod, Meyronne bloc settlement. Father Gravel died in Montreal on February 10, 1926, and was buried in Gravelbourg.

Legacy 

Louis-Pierre Gravel was designated a Person of National Historic Significance in 1956. The inscription on a monument in Gravelbourg built in 1958 to honour him reads:

References 

1868 births
1926 deaths
Persons of National Historic Significance (Canada)
People from Gravelbourg, Saskatchewan
People from Centre-du-Québec
French Quebecers
19th-century Canadian Roman Catholic priests
20th-century Canadian Roman Catholic priests